Meckhe is a commune in Senegal, which is located in the north-west of the country, between Dakar and Saint-Louis. It lies in the department of Tivaouane within the region of Thiès. Its population was counted at 22,944 in 2013. It is mostly of Wolof origin.

Economical activity is centered on agriculture, handicrafts, commerce and cattle breeding.

It is a sister city with  Saint-Dié-des-Vosges, France.

References

Populated places in Thiès Region
Communes of Senegal